The 2005 Sudirman Cup was the 9th tournament of the World Mixed Team Badminton Championships of Sudirman Cup. It was held from May 10 to May 15, 2005 in Beijing, China.

Host city selection
Beijing and Glasgow submitted bids for the competition. Beijing was confirmed as the host during 2003 IBF council meeting in Eindhoven.

Teams
41 teams around the world took part in this tournament. Geographically, they were 22 from Europe, 13 teams from Asia, 3 from Americas, two from Oceania and one from Africa. This edition also saw the expansion of Group 1 to 8 teams.

Results

Group 1

Subgroup 1A

Subgroup 1B

Playoff

Semi-finals

Final

Group 2

Subgroup 2A

Subgroup 2B

Playoff

Group 3

Subgroup 3A

Subgroup 3B

Playoff

Group 4

Subgroup 4A

Subgroup 4B

Playoff

Group 5

Subgroup 5A

Subgroup 5B

Playoff

Group 6

Final classification

References

External links
Official website 
제9회 세계혼합단체 배드민턴선수권대회 

Sudirman Cup
Sudirman Cup
Sudirman Cup
2005 Sudirman Cup
International sports competitions hosted by China